Lake of the Seven Winds (also listed as Seven Winds of the Lake) is located in Glacier National Park, in the U. S. state of Montana. The lake is northwest of Pitamakan Lake and east of McClintock Peak.

See also
List of lakes in Glacier County, Montana

References

Lakes of Glacier National Park (U.S.)
Lakes of Glacier County, Montana